Willem Kroesbergen (born 1943) is a Dutch harpsichord builder. His instruments have been used by soloists and ensembles, including Ton Koopman, Masaaki Suzuki and his Bach Collegium Japan and Reinhard Goebel's Musica Antiqua Köln. In 1991 he was awarded the Casper Hogenbijl Prize for his contribution to international early music. In 2007 he retired and moved to Cape Town in South Africa. After his retirement he did research on temperaments well known and in use during J.S. Bach's life.

References

External links 
http://em.oxfordjournals.org/content/4/4/439.extract
http://www.academia.edu/5210832/18th_Century_Quotes_on_J.S._Bachs_Temperament
http://www.huygens-fokker.org/docs/Kroesbergen_Bach_Temperament.pdf
https://www.academia.edu/4240290/18th_century_precursors_of_the_metronome (published for the first time in Dutch in Tijdschrift Oude Muziek in 1994 with co writer Jed Wentz)
https://www.academia.edu/9189419/Blankenburg_Equal_or_unequal_temperament_during_J.S._Bach_s_life

Living people
1943 births
People from Cape Town
Harpsichord makers
Dutch musical instrument makers